State Route 90 (SR 90) is a  state highway in Campbell and Claiborne counties in the U.S. state of Tennessee. It serves the communities of Morley, White Oak, Eagan and Clairfield in Tennessee, and Pruden at the Tennessee-Kentucky state line.

Route description
SR 90 begins in northern Campbell County at an intersection with U.S. Route 25W (US 25W) in the community of Morley, north of LaFollette and southeast of Jellico. The route then twists and turns through the Cumberland Mountains of northern Tennessee, climbing through a series of switchback curves to the top of Hickory Hill, where it passes through White Oak.  After descending from this ridge to Tackett Creek, the highway veers northeastward into the Clearfork Valley, where it traverses the communities of Anthras, Eagan, and Clairfield. It comes to an end at Kentucky Route 74 at the Kentucky state line in the old mining community of Pruden. KY 74 continues eastward through rugged mountain terrain to Middlesboro, Kentucky.

The route crosses the Clear Fork River twice and parallels the river for much of its length.

Major intersections

See also
 
 
 List of state routes in Tennessee

References

External links
 

090
Transportation in Campbell County, Tennessee
Transportation in Claiborne County, Tennessee